Chen Zhenhe (15 March 1906 – 28 January 1941) was a Chinese footballer. He competed in the men's tournament at the 1936 Summer Olympics.

Early life
Born in Batavia, Java in the then Netherlands East Indies, he was brought to China by his father to be brought up in their ancestral city of Xiamen. He entered the Shanghai Jinan National University in 1926, intending to study business administration.

Football career
He played in his university football team, winning eight championships in nine years. He next played for the Shanghai club You-You. Prior to his selection for the Olympic team he had played in the winning China national football team in the Far Eastern Games in 1930 and 1934 and was playing in the Shanghai You-You F.C.

Military career and death
In 1932 he entered the Chinese Central Aviation School and became commissioned in the Chinese Air Force. He served from 1937 in the Second Sino-Japanese War that became part of World War II. A Squadron Leader, he was killed in action when on the first flight of a new aircraft he crashed near Lanzhou.

References

External links
 
 

1906 births
1941 deaths
Aviators killed in aviation accidents or incidents in China
Chinese footballers
China international footballers
Olympic footballers of China
Footballers at the 1936 Summer Olympics
Sportspeople from Jakarta
Association football defenders
Chinese military personnel killed in World War II
Republic of China Air Force personnel
Emigrants from the Dutch East Indies to China
Victims of aviation accidents or incidents in 1941
20th-century Chinese people